Svetozar Mihajlović (born 1949) is a Bosnian Serb politician who served as the Co-Chairman of the Council of Ministers of Bosnia and Herzegovina from 3 February 1999 until 6 June 2000.

He subsequently served as Minister of Civil Affairs and Communication. He is currently a member of the Senate of Republika Srpska.

References

1949 births
Living people
Place of birth missing (living people)
Serbs of Bosnia and Herzegovina
Politicians of Republika Srpska
Socialist Party (Bosnia and Herzegovina) politicians
Government ministers of Bosnia and Herzegovina